Mpxplay is a 32-bit console audio player for MS-DOS and Windows. It supports a wide range of audio codecs, playlists, as well as containers for video formats. The MS-DOS version uses a 32-bit DOS extender (DOS/32 Advanced DOS Extender being the most up-to-date version compatible).

Features

Mpxplay supports many features unique to it among DOS/console media players.  These include:
 Native (DOS) support of many modern sound cards and sound chipsets
 Commander-style directory, file and playlist handling
 Multichannel support at AAC, AC3, DTS, FLAC and Vorbis inputs, and Win32/DirectSound, WAV-file outputs
 Real-time DSP functions (volume control, surround, speed, tone control and crossfade)
 Unicode (UTF-8, UTF-16) ID3tag/APETag and playlist handling (reading and writing)
 Using of external DLLs, like audio decoders and encoders (DOS/4G and Win32 versions of Mpxplay)
 FTP client (remote directory browsing and direct playing from FTP servers)
 LCD screen support (DOS only)
 Support for reading and displaying long filenames under DOS using DOSLFN
 Built-in TCP/IP stack with HTTP support for playing Internet radio streams

Formats

Native support for audio includes:
 AAC
 AC3
 ALAC
 APE
 FLAC
 MP2/MP3
 MPC
 Vorbis
 WMA
 WV
 AIF
 WAV/W64
 Audio CD playing and ripping (CDW)

Audio streams from these containers are supported as well:
 AVI
 ASF
 FLV
 MKV
 MP4/MOV
 MPG/VOB
 OGG and TS containers.

With plugins it plays:
 DTS
 MOD
 Opus
 SPX

Playlist support includes:
 M3U
 M3U8
 PLS
 FPL
 CUE
 MXU

System requirements

Mpxplay on DOS requires a ~100 MHz i486 (or faster) CPU for real-time playback (the exact value depends mostly on the format of the file being played), 4-8 MiB RAM, and MS-DOS 5.00+ or equivalent (FreeDOS, DR-DOS).

Sound card support

Mpxplay supports sound cards using one of two methods: natively or through emulation.  Native support is achieved by having drivers in Mpxplay that are capable of writing to the sound card directly.  When native support is used more of the sound cards features are available such as the ability to use 32-bit sound.

Cards that are currently supported for native access are:
 Sound Blaster Live and Live 24
 Sound Blaster Audigy 1, 2, 4, and LS
 SB Ensoniq (SB PCI 16/64/128)
 CMI 8338 and 8738
 Intel ICH
 Intel HDA
 VIA 686,8233, and 8235

Cards supported through emulation typically need a TSR driver wrapper, a program that translates the codes for one type of sound card to the one actually in the machine.  This can be used to gain the ability to use a sound card that typically is not well supported by the majority of DOS applications.  As DOS needs drivers to be programmed into each application in which they are used, it can be useful to run a sound card that is nearly universally supported by most applications with sound support: SoundBlaster 16.

Mpxplay can use this technique to support the following sound cards:
 ESS
 Gravis Ultrasound
 Sound Blaster 16
 Sound Blaster Pro
 Windows Sound System

The Win32 version of Mpxplay is a multi-threaded console application with the following sound outputs:
 DirectSound (DirectX v3 or higher)
 Wave Mapper (all Win versions)

See also

 Mplayer - Video and audio player, also has DOS version
 Dosamp - Very old DOS audio player
 Comparison of audio player software

External links
 Mediaplayers at DR-DOS Wiki - more info on MPXPLAY and other DOS audio and video players, more screenshots

DOS media players